La Nature (English: Nature) was a French language magazine aimed at the popularization of science established in 1873 by French scientist and adventurer Gaston Tissandier. The magazine also received an enormous amount of time, effort, and contributions from his brother, Albert Tissandier.

Evolution

The beginning
From 1873 to 1914, each year's volume started at the beginning of December. The second six-month period began with the first issue in June. Starting in 1915, La Nature'''s publishing year was brought in sync with the calendar year.

A weekly magazine until the 1920s, it became first fortnightly and then monthly in 1948.

Second World War
During the Second World War, La Nature was published only erratically. The first interruption in publishing lasted from September 15 to December 15, 1939, with only an additional six issues published during all of 1940. 1941 saw 12 issues published, on the 15th of each month. There were other suspensions in publication, such that only 26 issues were published between 1942 and 1945. The magazine returned to its pre-war biweekly schedule in 1945.

Name changes and merger
In 1961, La Nature changed its name to La Nature Science Progrès (loosely Nature Magazine: Advances in Science) then in 1963 to Science Progrès La Nature (Advances in Science: Nature Magazine) before becoming Science Progrès Découverte (Advances in Science Discovered) in 1969. Finally, in 1972, La Nature merged with the scientific magazine La Recherche, which is still in print today.

Editors-in-chief
The following have been editor-in-chief of the magazine:
 Gaston Tissandier
 Henri de Parville
 E.-A. Martel
 Jules Laffargue
 L. de Launay
 André Troller
 Paul Ostoya (1957-1969)

References
 Manuel Chemineau : Généalogies et fortunes de LA NATURE. Repérages pour l’étude réflexive d’une revue de vulgarisation scientifique du XIXe siècle. Thesis, University of Vienna 2005
 Summaries and history of La Nature

External links
 La Nature, complete year runs 1873—1905, digitized by Conservatoire National des Arts et Métiers, ParisThis article incorporates text from the French language Wikipedia article'' La Nature.

1873 establishments in France
1972 disestablishments in France
Defunct magazines published in France
French-language magazines
Magazines established in 1873
Magazines disestablished in 1972
Monthly magazines published in France
Popular science magazines